The Shreveport Giants were a minor league baseball team based in Shreveport, Louisiana. The team played from 1901 to 1903 in the Southern Association. The team became the Shreveport Pirates in 1904.

References

 
Defunct Southern Association teams
Defunct minor league baseball teams
Baseball teams established in 1901
Giants
Professional baseball teams in Louisiana
San Francisco Giants minor league affiliates
Defunct baseball teams in Louisiana
1901 establishments in Louisiana
Sports clubs disestablished in 1903
Baseball teams disestablished in 1903